Ryne Andrew Sanborn (born February 3, 1989) is an American ice hockey player and former actor. He is best known for his role as Jason Cross in the High School Musical films. In 2008 he retired from acting to study architecture at University of Utah. He plays ice hockey for the Salt Lake Outliers.

Career
Sanborn began modeling at two years old. He co-starred in the 1997 TV movie Not in This Town at age seven. Following this, he received guest roles on Touched by an Angel (1998) and Everwood (2003). In 2002, Sanborn portrayed the main "Child of Light" in the Opening and Closing Ceremonies of the Salt Lake Winter Olympics. Sanborn is best known for playing the role of Jason Cross, a member of the East High School boys' varsity basketball team, in High School Musical, High School Musical 2 and High School Musical 3: Senior Year. Sanborn also appeared in the independent movie The Adventures of Food Boy. In 2008, he retired from acting to study architecture.

Ice hockey
Sanborn attended Taylorsville High School where he played for the hockey team as well as for the under-16 Utah Stars team. As of 2012, he plays ice hockey for Salt Lake's Outliers.

Filmography

References

External links

American male child actors
American male television actors
People from Taylorsville, Utah
1989 births
Living people